Miroslav Vítek (30 March 1909 – 30 March 1976) was a Czechoslovak athlete. He competed in the men's discus throw and shot put at the 1936 Summer Olympics.

References

External links
 

1909 births
1976 deaths
Athletes (track and field) at the 1936 Summer Olympics
Czechoslovak male discus throwers
Czechoslovak male shot putters
Olympic athletes of Czechoslovakia
People from Ivančice
Sportspeople from the South Moravian Region